Hypomyces is a genus of parasitic ascomycete fungi found in Europe, North America, Australia, and parts of China. The genus contains 53 species. Better known species include the lobster mushroom (Hypomyces lactifluorum) and the bolete eater (Hypomyces chrysospermus).

List of noteworthy species
 H. cervinigenus - on Helvella lacunosa.
 H. chrysospermus - Bolete Eater, Cask fungus (Eurasia, Western Australia, North America)
 H. hyalinus - Amanita "mold" (North America)
 H. lactifluorum - Lobster mushroom (North America)
 H. luteovirens - Yellow-green Russula "mold" (North America)
 H. transformans - Ramaria Eater (North America)

Ecology 
All Hypomyces species live as parasites on other fungi. The fruiting bodies of hypomyces are inconspicuous and generally consist of a cystic shell that is only about 1 mm in diameter and height. These fruiting bodies often cluster on the fruiting bodies of other host fungi, transforming the shape and color of the host into something different from the host's original appearance. The most commonly recognized form is the one in which the host's fruiting body is integrated with the cystic shell of the hypomyces.

Shape 
The individual fungi bodies are finely grained, and many of them exhibit long, narrow ellipsoids under magnification. Their diameter and height are usually about 1 to 2 mm.  In general, hyphae are spread on the surface of a host fruit body and buried in the mycelium to form a large number of fruiting bodies. These can be yellow, white, olive, tan, pink or red, and present within the host or in the hypha mat.

The individual fruiting bodies are microscopically granular, and under a magnifying glass, many of them show elongated ellipsoid shapes, and are usually only 1-2 mm in diameter and height. Generally, hyphae are spread on the surface of a host fruiting body and buried in the mycelium to form a large number of fruiting bodies. The color of the fruiting bodies themselves or the mycelial mat covering the host surface can be yellow, white, olive, yellowish brown, pink, or red. Countless of asci form inside each fruiting body, which are then ejected into the outside world through the hole at the tip of the fruiting body.

The asci formed inside the fruiting body is elongated and cylindrical, with a dome-shaped structure called the "apical cap" at the tip. Eight spores are formed inside each ascus. The spores are generally somewhat angular and ellipsoid, and in many species are separated by a single septum, usually colorless to pale yellow, with thick cell walls and wart-like or bump-like patterns on the surface. Some species have horn-shaped or cap-shaped "appendages" at both ends of the spores.

Life cycle 
Most species reproduce asexually. Asexual regeneration spores are generally referred to as thick-wall spores, as they have thick cell walls presumably to maintain a system of dormancy and endurance. Unfortunately, the precise mechanisms of spore reproduction, specifically the methods used to find and infest hosts is largely unknown.

Hosts 
Each species of fungus in the genus Hypomyces has a general preference for the type of host it prefers.

In addition to terrestrial mushrooms of the genera Amanita, Russula, Lactifluus, Suillus, Xerocomus, and Boletus, other species that form hard, cork-like fruiting bodies on trees, such as Trametes and Stereum, can also serve as hosts.

Auricularia auricula-judae that produce colloidal fruiting bodies, and Pezizaceae belonging to the ascomycote fungi (e.g., Helvella, Humaria, and Leotia lubrica) are also known to serve as hosts.

When infested by fungi of Hypomyces, many of the mushrooms of the genus Amanita do not develop a cap(Pileus), but rather form a deformity with a morphology reminiscent of male genitalia. In those of the genus Russula, the gaps between the folds of the host's lamella are filled with mycelium of hypomyces, showing ridged marks. In the genera Xerocomus, and Boletus, the development of the mushroom cap is often suppressed and the tubular pores formed on the underside of the host's lamellae are also filled with mycelium of hypomyces. In any case, the host mushroom's own spore formation and dispersal are hindered.

Distribution 
Species of Hypomyces have been found in Europe, North America, Australia, and parts of China. There are at least 19 species recorded in Japan.

Edibility 
Hypomyces lactifluorum, whose main hosts are Russula and Lactifluus, is commonly called lobster mushroom in North America and United Kingdom. Depending on the type of mushroom that was parasitized, the cap may be very bitter, and in some cases inedible. If edible, it is often eaten stewed in cream sauce, fried, as a salad ingredient, or as an ingredient in pasta dishes. This species is also found in Japan.

Other species

Hypomyces agaricola
Hypomyces albidus
Hypomyces albus
Hypomyces amaurodermatis
Hypomyces apiculatus
Hypomyces apiosporus
Hypomyces arachnoideus
Hypomyces arecae
Hypomyces arenaceus
Hypomyces armeniacus
Hypomyces asclepiadis
Hypomyces ater
Hypomyces aurantiicolor
Hypomyces aurantius
Hypomyces auriculariicola
Hypomyces australbidus
Hypomyces australiensis
Hypomyces australis
Hypomyces badius
Hypomyces banningiae
Hypomyces batavus
Hypomyces biasolettianus
Hypomyces boleticola
Hypomyces boletinus
Hypomyces boletiphagus
Hypomyces bombacinus
Hypomyces bresadolae
Hypomyces bresadolanus
Hypomyces camphorati
Hypomyces caulicola
Hypomyces cervinigenus
Hypomyces cervinus
Hypomyces cesatii
Hypomyces chlorinigenus
Hypomyces chlorinus
Hypomyces chromaticus
Hypomyces chrysospermus
Hypomyces completus
Hypomyces conviva
Hypomyces corticiicola
Hypomyces dactylarioides
Hypomyces deformans
Hypomyces destruens-equi
Hypomyces ekmanii
Hypomyces epimyces
Hypomyces favoli
Hypomyces flavescens
Hypomyces flavolanatus
Hypomyces floccosus
Hypomyces fulgens
Hypomyces fusisporus
Hypomyces galericola
Hypomyces goroshankianus
Hypomyces hrubyanus
Hypomyces hyacinthi
Hypomyces hyalinus
Hypomyces inaequalis
Hypomyces insignis
Hypomyces javanicus
Hypomyces khaoyaiensis
Hypomyces lactifluorum
Hypomyces laeticolor
Hypomyces lateritius
Hypomyces leotiarum
Hypomyces leotiicola
Hypomyces linearis
Hypomyces linkii
Hypomyces lithuanicus
Hypomyces macrosporus
Hypomyces melanocarpus
Hypomyces melanochlorus
Hypomyces melanostigma
Hypomyces microspermus
Hypomyces miliarius
Hypomyces mycogones
Hypomyces mycophilus
Hypomyces niveus
Hypomyces novae-zelandiae
Hypomyces ochraceus
Hypomyces odoratus
Hypomyces orthosporus
Hypomyces paeonius
Hypomyces pallidus
Hypomyces pannosus
Hypomyces papulasporae
Hypomyces papyraceus
Hypomyces parvisporus
Hypomyces parvus
Hypomyces penicillatus
Hypomyces pergamenus
Hypomyces perniciosus
Hypomyces petchii
Hypomyces pezizae
Hypomyces polyporinus
Hypomyces porphyreus
Hypomyces pseudocorticiicola
Hypomyces pseudopolyporinus
Hypomyces psiloti
Hypomyces puertoricensis
Hypomyces purpureus
Hypomyces robledoi
Hypomyces rosellus
Hypomyces rostratus
Hypomyces rubi
Hypomyces semitranslucens
Hypomyces sepulchralis
Hypomyces sepultariae
Hypomyces siamensis
Hypomyces sibirinae
Hypomyces spadiceus
Hypomyces stephanomatis
Hypomyces stereicola
Hypomyces stuhlmannii
Hypomyces subaurantius
Hypomyces subiculosus
Hypomyces succineus
Hypomyces sulphureus
Hypomyces sympodiophorus
Hypomyces tegillum
Hypomyces terrestris
Hypomyces thailandicus
Hypomyces thiryanus
Hypomyces tomentosus
Hypomyces torminosus
Hypomyces transformans
Hypomyces trichoderma
Hypomyces triseptatus
Hypomyces tubericola
Hypomyces tuberosus
Hypomyces tulasneanus
Hypomyces vanbruntianus
Hypomyces vandae
Hypomyces villosus
Hypomyces viridigriseus
Hypomyces viridis
Hypomyces volemi
Hypomyces vuilleminianus
Hypomyces xyloboli
Hypomyces xylophilus

References

External links

Sordariomycetes genera
Parasitic fungi
Hypocreaceae
Science articles needing translation from Japanese Wikipedia
Taxa named by Elias Magnus Fries